The National Speed Skating Oval (The Ice Ribbon) is a speed skating arena which is the only new venue built on Beijing's Olympic Green for the Winter Olympics. It hosts the speed skating competitions at the 2022 Winter Olympics. It was built on the location of the former Olympic Green Hockey Field used for field hockey event and the Olympic Green Archery Field used for the archery event.

It can accommodate 12,000 spectators (6,800 permanent and 5,200 temporary seats) according to the bid book. After the games it is foreseen to use it as a public skating venue and for ice hockey clubs.

Designed by Populous and Beijing Institute of Architectural Design, construction began in mid-2017, and was completed in 2019. First competition was held on October 8, 2021. It has an area of 12,000 square meters, being the largest speed skating venue in Asia. The facade is highlighted by 22 "ice ribbon" with a length of 622 meters each. The second floor has a Temple of Heaven-inspired curved curtain wall system.

Technologies 
This Olympic venue is one of the few large-size ice arenas in the world that uses  refrigerant.  is used as both refrigerant in cooling system and secondary refrigerant in cooling distribution system, including the rink pipes. The arena has been completed with a heat recovery function, that can cover arena heating demands like ventilation, air dehumidification, hot water production, etc. The refrigeration  rack, including cooling machines, has 4 MW max cooling capacity.

Track records

Men

Women

References

External links

Indoor arenas in China
Olympic speed skating venues
Indoor speed skating venues
Venues of the 2022 Winter Olympics
Speed skating venues in China
Sports venues in Beijing
Buildings and structures in Chaoyang District, Beijing
2021 establishments in China
Sports venues completed in 2021